Jorge Adelbio Soto Pereira (born 8 August 1986, in Salto, Uruguay) is a road bicycle racer and track cyclist, who is affiliated with the Centro Recreativo Porongos Fútbol Club of Trinidad.

He has won several stages of both Rutas de América as Vuelta Ciclista del Uruguay. In 2005, he received a grant for a month in Switzerland in the World Cycling Centre of the UCI to improve his performance, which ultimately became more than a year.

Soto represented Uruguay at the 2012 Summer Olympics in the Men's road race.

Honours
Rutas de América (2): 2011, 2012
2011 Vuelta Ciclista del Uruguay: 3rd
2005 Manchester World Cup (Scratch): 8th

References

1986 births
Living people
Sportspeople from Salto, Uruguay
Uruguayan track cyclists
Olympic cyclists of Uruguay
Cyclists at the 2012 Summer Olympics
Uruguayan male cyclists